Rusty Mitchell (born November 29, 1982) is an American racing driver from Midland, Texas.

In 2007 and 2008 Mitchel drove in Formula SCCA competition, winning the June Sprints and Southwest Division title in 2007 and finishing second in the Southwest division in 2008. In 2008 he also made his Star Mazda Series debut driving for his own team in nine races and finishing 17th in the championship. In 2009 he drove full-time in Star Mazda and finished 12th in points. In 2010 he returned to Star Mazda, merging his team with Juncos Racing in the middle of the season, he again finished 9th in the championship. In 2011 he has signed with Intersport Racing to drive in the American Le Mans Series' LMPC class and signed with Team E to make his Firestone Indy Lights debut at the Long Beach Grand Prix. He finished 11th in the race. Later in the season he signed to compete in the Freedom 100 for the team and four more late-season races.

Star Mazda Championship

References

External links
Rusty Mitchell official website

1982 births
Indy Lights drivers
Indy Pro 2000 Championship drivers
American Le Mans Series drivers
People from Midland, Texas
Living people
Racing drivers from Texas
24 Hours of Daytona drivers
WeatherTech SportsCar Championship drivers

Juncos Hollinger Racing drivers
JDC Motorsports drivers